Oat Valley  (Pomo language: Bal-lo’ ki) is a former settlement in Yolo County, California.

A post office operated at Oat Valley from 1869 to 1875.

References

Former settlements in Yolo County, California
Former populated places in California